Princess Konstancja Sanguszko (1716–1791), was a Polish magnate.

She was the daughter of Count Stanislas Ernst von Dönhoff and Countess Maria Katharina Johanna von Dönhoff (1686-1723). Konstancja was married to Prince Janusz Aleksander Sanguszko in 1731. She lived separated from her spouse, who was homosexual and abandoned her shortly after the wedding. She lived in Gdansk, and played a political role during the Bar Confederation (1768–1772), when she contributed to the formation of the Confederation. In 1780, she remarried Józef Rogaliński, who abandoned her, wasted her fortune and left her to die in poverty. She was involved in long lawsuits with both of her husbands which attracted great attention.

References

 Maria Czeppe i Roman Marcinek Konstancja Kolumba Sanguszkowa w Polski Słownik Biograficzny tom XXXIV wyd. 1992-1993 s.523

18th-century Polish–Lithuanian politicians
18th-century Polish women
1716 births
1791 deaths
Konstancja
Bar confederates
18th-century women politicians
18th-century Polish nobility